QTY is an American indie rock band from New York City signed to Dirty Hit Records. The group consists of singers and guitarists Dan Lardner and Alex Niemetz as well as bassist Peter Baumann and drummer Alan Yuch. 

The band recorded their debut album in London, produced by former Suede member Bernard Butler. The self-titled album was released in December 2017 to early critical acclaim, including favorable reviews in such publications as the NME. The group also earned a spot on the NME 100: 2018 Best New Bands List.

The group describes its sound as "guitar-driven lyrical rock music with pop sensibilities," and is often placed in the lineage of New York rock bands such as The Velvet Underground, television, and The Strokes based on the guitar-based sound and Lardner's New York-style laconic vocal delivery. However, their influences stretch beyond their hometown, including glam rock-era acts, especially David Bowie, as well as 1990s lo-fi indie rock icons such as Royal Trux and Silver Jews. Lyrics play a key part of the band's appeal, where Lardner's lyrics are often lauded for his observant, introspective nature about the struggle of the band's everyday lives.

History 
The band formed in 2014, after members of former band Grand Rapids disbanded the year prior. Lardner and Niemetz recorded some early demos in San Francisco through connections in their friend network, which received attention from Dirty Hit after Lardner's roommate sent the demos to a contact at the record label, who immediately contacted the band expressing interest. The band went on to sign to the label as their first US-based band, having formerly been known for a repertoire of notable British acts including The 1975, Wolf Alice, and Pale Waves. Lardner and Niemetz recorded early singles with Bernard Butler, including Rodeo released in October 2016 and Dress/Undress released in February 2017. 

QTY played few early shows following their signing on the encouragement of the record label until the band went on their first North American tour opening for the Bad Suns and then a series of headlining shows in the fall of 2017.

The name is pronounced by saying each letter individually, but it is a play-off the "cuties" clementine oranges, based on Lardner's reference to Niemetz as a "cutie" due to her hair color. Romy from the band The xx suggested the band refer to themselves instead as just "Q.T.Y."

Discography

References

External links 
Official website

American indie rock groups
Dirty Hit artists